Neodymium-doped gadolinium orthovanadate, typically abbreviated as Nd:GdVO4, is one of the active laser medium for diode laser-pumped solid-state lasers. Several advantages over Nd:YAG crystals include a larger emission cross-section, a pump power threshold, a wider absorption bandwidth, and a polarized output.

Optical properties 
The luminescence lifetime (spontaneous emission lifetime) is a function of Nd3+ ion concentration as seen in the table.

References

Laser gain media
Crystals
Neodymium compounds
Gadolinium compounds
Vanadates